The 2021 WTA Slovenia Open (also known as the Zavarovalnica Sava Portorož for sponsorship purposes) was a WTA 250 tournament played on outdoor hard courts. It was the 7th edition of the Slovenia Open, last held in 2010. It was primarily organised due to the cancellation of the Asian tournaments during the 2021 season because of the ongoing COVID-19 pandemic. The 2021 event took place at the Tennis Club Portorož in Portorož, Slovenia from 13 to 19 September 2021.

Champions

Singles

  Jasmine Paolini def.  Alison Riske, 7–6(7–4), 6–2

This was Paolini's maiden WTA Tour singles title.

Doubles

 Anna Kalinskaya /  Tereza Mihalíková def.  Aleksandra Krunić /  Lesley Pattinama Kerkhove, 4–6, 6–2, [12–10]

Singles main-draw entrants

Seeds

 Rankings are as of August 30, 2021.

Other entrants
The following players received wildcards into the singles main draw:
  Živa Falkner 
  Pia Lovrič
  Nika Radišić

The following players received entry from the qualifying draw:
  Katie Boulter 
  Lucia Bronzetti
  Cristiana Ferrando 
  Aleksandra Krunić
  Viktória Kužmová
  Tereza Mrdeža

Withdrawals
Before the tournament
  Paula Badosa → replaced by  Sara Errani
  Anna Blinkova → replaced by  Jaqueline Cristian
  Caroline Garcia → replaced by  Kristína Kučová
  Polona Hercog → replaced by  Kaja Juvan
  Daria Kasatkina → replaced by  Ana Konjuh
  Elena-Gabriela Ruse → replaced by  Anna Kalinskaya
  Sara Sorribes Tormo → replaced by  Jasmine Paolini

Doubles main-draw entrants

Seeds

1 Rankings are as of 30 August 2021.

Other entrants
The following pairs received wildcards into the doubles main draw:
  Tina Cvetkovič /  Ela Nala Milić
  Živa Falkner /  Pia Lovrič

Withdrawals
Before the tournament
  Mihaela Buzărnescu /  Katarzyna Piter → replaced by  Katarzyna Piter /  Heather Watson
  Harriet Dart /  Renata Voráčová → replaced by  Danka Kovinić /  Renata Voráčová
  Katarzyna Kawa /  Tereza Mihalíková → replaced by  Anna Kalinskaya /  Tereza Mihalíková
  Monica Niculescu /  Elena-Gabriela Ruse → replaced by  Rutuja Bhosale /  Emily Webley-Smith

References

External links
WTA website

2021 WTA Tour
2021 in Slovenian sport
September 2021 sports events in Slovenia
2021